Claude Audran III (25 August 1658 – 27 May 1734) was a French painter.

Audran was born in Lyon into a family of artists. He lived with his uncle, Claude Audran the Younger. Painter to the Louis XIV of France in 1699. From 1700-1701 he took part in the decoration of the Menagerie of Versailles and the Chapels of Versailles, and the Palace of Fontainebleau, Château d'Anet, Château de Meudon, and Les Invalides. In 1704, he decorated the new apartment of the Duchess at the Château de Sceaux. Audran obtained the office of Keeper of the Luxembourg Palace in 1704. In 1709, he executed a backdrop for King Louis XIV at the Château de Marly. This setting, now destroyed, is known from preparatory drawings.

He was a decorative artist, and made a number of tapestries for the Gobelins. Audran's style included arabesques, grotesques and singeries. He died in Paris in 1734.

References

Further reading

External links
 "The Audran" by Georges Duplessis (French), 1892
 Les Audran / par Georges Duplessis (French)

1658 births
1734 deaths
17th-century French painters
French male painters
18th-century French painters
18th-century French male artists